Anwar Mohamed Boudjakdji (born September 1, 1976) is a retired Algerian football player who played as a midfielder.

National team statistics

Honours
 Won the Algerian League once with JS Kabylie in 2006
 Won the Arab Champions League once with WA Tlemcen in 1998
 Won the Algerian Cup once with WA Tlemcen in 1998
 Has 12 caps for the Algerian National Team

References

1976 births
Algerian footballers
Living people
JS Kabylie players
Algeria international footballers
MC Oran players
WA Tlemcen players
People from Tlemcen
Association football midfielders
21st-century Algerian people